Nguyễn Thị Nguyệt (born 5 November 1992) is a Vietnamese footballer who plays as a forward.

International goals

Vietnam U20

External links 
 

1992 births
Living people
Women's association football forwards
Vietnamese women's footballers
Place of birth missing (living people)
Vietnam women's international footballers
Asian Games competitors for Vietnam
Footballers at the 2014 Asian Games
Southeast Asian Games gold medalists for Vietnam
Southeast Asian Games medalists in football
Competitors at the 2017 Southeast Asian Games
Southeast Asian Games silver medalists for Vietnam
Competitors at the 2013 Southeast Asian Games
21st-century Vietnamese women